Bungalo Records is a record label and distribution company, exclusively distributed by Universal Music Group. Bungalo Records was formed in 2000 and has been with Universal Music Group for 21 years. Best known as one of America's pioneering independent record labels, Bungalo Records has distributed mainstream artists such as DJ Quik, Mack 10, Patti LaBelle, Rodney Jerkins, The Jacksons, La Toya Jackson, Carl Thomas (singer), Suga Free, Russel Simmons & Babyface (musician) (Wake Up Everybody (2004 album)), Fred Hammond, The Game (rapper) (Stop Snitchin, Stop Lyin DVD), Mannie Fresh, Kurupt and Heavy D.

Artists
Marc Johnson 
The Dazz Band Featuring Jerry Bell
Jerry Bell
Agnes Chan
Chino XL
DeLon
Fans of Jimmy Century 
Frenchie
Mannie Fresh
Heavy D
Juice Lee
La Toya Jackson
Rodney Jerkins
K-Ci
CeCe Peniston (via West Swagg)
Remedy
Carl Thomas
The Stick People
Nacole Rice (via Suthun Music Group| Cartel Music Group)
Tony Haynes and Stephane d'Esposito, The Pianist and The Poet
Kaliz-Mo
Jake Noch
Thuggi Pashiaan
Maddi Madd

Former artists
Bizzy Bone
Deion Sanders
Kurupt
Lil Rounds
Mack 10
Patti LaBelle
iRome
Sway & Tech
Suga Free
Janet Jackson
Chingy

See also
 List of record labels

References

External links
Official website

Record labels established in 2004
American record labels
Labels distributed by Universal Music Group
Hip hop record labels